McCole is a Scottish surname. Notable people with the surname include:

Brendan McCole, Irish Gaelic footballer
John McCole (1936–1982), Scottish footballer
Paul McCole (born 1972), Scottish actor and comedian
Stephen McCole, Scottish actor

Surnames of Scottish origin